Zeq (also Romanized as Z̄eq; also known as Z̄eqq Zālyāb) is a village in Kuhdasht-e Jonubi Rural District, in the Central District of Kuhdasht County, Lorestan Province, Iran. At the 2006 census, its population was 404, in 75 families.

References 

Towns and villages in Kuhdasht County